Verkhny Avzyan (Ürge Äwjän) is a rural locality (a selo) and the administrative centre of Verkhneavzyansky Selsoviet, Beloretsky District, Bashkortostan, Russia. The population was 2,024 as of 2010. There are 30 streets.

Geography 
Verkhny Avzyan is located 91 km southwest of Beloretsk (the district's administrative centre) by road. Nizhny Avzyan is the nearest rural locality.

References 

Rural localities in Beloretsky District